Erica Anne Batchelor (born 10 August 1933, in Poole, England) is a British figure skater. She is the 1954 World bronze medalist, the 1953 European silver medalist and three-time (1953, 1955 & 1956) European bronze medalist. She represented Great Britain at the 1956 Winter Olympics, where she placed 11th. She resided in Edinburgh, Scotland in 1957 and left there for Bournemouth, England to turn professional. She had her portrait painted in Edinburgh, Scotland by Paul Seton Bramley in 1957. The same painter offered to the skater's friend Russ Christensen, who had accompanied the skater to portrait sessions, to do his portrait. The offer was accepted.

Results

References

 Sports-reference profile
 
 
 Reminiscence of Russell Bartlett Christensen of Farmington, Maine 26 July 2018.

1933 births
Living people
British female single skaters
Olympic figure skaters of Great Britain
Figure skaters at the 1956 Winter Olympics
Sportspeople from Poole
World Figure Skating Championships medalists
European Figure Skating Championships medalists